‘Wild law’ refers to human laws consistent with Earth jurisprudence. A wild law regulates human behavior that privileges maintaining the integrity and functioning of the whole Earth community in the long term over the interests of any species (including humans) at a particular time.

Background

Wild laws are designed to regulate human participation within this wider community.  They seek to balance the rights and responsibilities of humans against those of other members of the community of beings within the natural environment that constitutes Earth (e.g. plants, animals, rivers, and ecosystems) in order to safe-guard the rights of all the members of the Earth community.

Wild laws may be distinguished from laws based on the understanding that Earth is a conglomeration of objects which human beings are entitled to exploit for their exclusive benefit (e.g. most property laws).  The development of wild laws is motivated partially by the belief that it is desirable, and essential to the survival of many species (probably including humans), for us to change our relationship with the natural world from one of exploitation to a more ‘democratic’ participation in a community of other beings.  This requires laws that firstly, recognise that other members of the Earth community have rights, and secondly, restrain humans from unjustifiably infringing those rights (as is done within the human community).

Applications and consensus

As a field, wild law cannot easily be categorised within traditional legal categories (e.g. substantive, procedural, private or public law).  It is perhaps better understood as an approach to human governance, rather than as a branch of law or a collection of laws.

A conference based on the concept of wild law was held in November 2005 at the University of Brighton, UK. The conference was chaired by former Environment Minister Michael Meacher MP and speakers included Jacqueline McGlade, head of the European Environment Agency and Lynda Warren of the Environment Agency.

In November 2006, a conference based on the book Wild Law by Cormac Cullinan was held at the University of Brighton, UK, and organised jointly by UKELA and ELF. 'A Walk on the Wild Side: Changing Environmental Law' and was chaired by John Elkington (of SustainAbility and the ELF Advisory Council) with guest speakers, Cormac Cullinan, Norman Baker MP (former Liberal Democrat Environment Spokesman), Satish Kumar (Resurgence) and Begonia Filgueira (Gaia Law Ltd).

"A ‘Wild Law’ Response to Climate Change" workshop was held in September 2007 to develop a practical approach for applying Wild Law principles which are already helping shift legal processes in the US and South Africa.  Organised by UKELA, with support from ELF and the Gaia Foundation, London and sponsored by The Body Shop.  Held at a conference centre in Derbyshire in the UK, with internationally renowned speakers Cormac Cullinan, author of Wild Law, Professor Brian Goodwin, visiting scholar and teacher on MSc in Holistic Science, at the Schumacher College, International Centre for Ecological Studies, Devon, Andrew Kimbrell, executive director of The Center for Food Safety in USA and founder of the International Center for Technology Assessment, Peter Roderick, director of the Climate Justice Programme and was Friends of the Earth's lawyer in London from 1996.

The "’Wild Law’ - Ideas into Action" residential workshop is to be held in September 2008, to launch the first phase of international research by the UKELA and the Gaia Foundation to identify Wild Law in practice and provide a Wild Law toolkit for decision makers and practitioners. Held at a conference centre in Derbyshire, UK, workshop leaders include: Mellese Damtie, Ethiopian lawyer and biologist, former Dean of the Legal Department at Ethiopia's Civil Service College, Andrew Kimbrell, public interest attorney, activist and author, executive director of the Centre for Food Safety in USA and founder of the International Centre for Technology Assessment; and Professor Lynda Warren, emeritus professor at Aberystwyth University, environmental consultant and the research supervisor. Also participating, research paper coordinators, Begonia Filgueira, of Gaia Law Ltd and ERIC Ltd, and Ian Mason, practising barrister and Director of the Earth Jurisprudence Resource Centre; Cormac Cullinan, an environmental lawyer based in Cape Town, South Africa, author of Wild Law, director of the leading South African environmental law firm, Cullinan and Associates Inc., and CEO of EnAct International, an environmental governance consultancy; and Ng’anga Thiong’o, legal and policy adviser for Kenyan community NGO, Porini, and formerly to Green Belt Movement and Nobel prize winner, Wangari Maathai. This event is facilitated by Elizabeth Rivers, former commercial lawyer and professional facilitator, and Vicki Elcoate, Executive Director of UKELA.

See also

Conservation movement
Environmentalism
Environmental movement
Environmental organizations
Environmental personhood
Green party
Green politics
List of environmental organizations
List of environmental issues
Nature
Natural landscape
Sustainability
Sustainable development

References

Literature
Cormac Cullinan, Wild Law: A Manifesto for Earth Justice, Green Books, Totnes, Devon, 2003 ; first published by Siber Ink, Cape Town, South Africa, August 2002 
Simon Boyle, 'On thin ice', The Guardian newspaper, London, November 2006
Stephen Harding, 'Earthly rights', The Guardian newspaper, London, April 2007
Silver Donald Cameron, 'When does a tree have rights?', The Chronicle Herald (Halifax, Nova Scotia), January, 2007
Cormac Cullinan, 'If Nature Had Rights', Orion (magazine), USA, January 2008

External links
Center for Earth Jurisprudence
The Gaia Foundation, London
UKELA
Earth Law
The E.F. Schumacher Society
Siber Ink, the original publisher of Wild Law.

Environmental law
Philosophy of law